Henry Cumming may refer to:
 Henry Harford Cumming (1799–1866), businessman in antebellum Augusta, Georgia
 Henry Cumming (athlete) (1905–1945), American sprinter
 Henry John Cumming (1771–1856), senior officer in the British Army

See also
 Henry J. B. Cummings (1831–1909), lawyer, Civil War officer, editor and publisher